Nong Chim railway station is a railway station located in Nong Chim Subdistrict, Noen Sa-nga District, Chaiyaphum Province.

References 

Railway stations in Thailand
Chaiyaphum province